Rosina Fiorini Galli (August 10. 1906 – December 3, 1969) was an Italian film actress in Hollywood.

Early years 
Galli was born in Venice and was a member of "a typical Italian theatrical family". She began performing as a child.

Career 
Galli was an Italian character actress who worked in Hollywood between the mid-1930s and the mid-1940s, where she performed in about 40 films. She appeared with Clark Gable in They Met in Bombay (1941) and played Christine's maid in The Phantom of the Opera (1943). The actress also portrayed the friendly wife of J. Carrol Naish in Star in the Night (1945), an Academy-Award-winning short film by Don Siegel. Through her accent she frequently played motherly characters of Italian or Spanish descent, mostly in small roles. Afterwards Galli returned to Italy where she also played in three other movies until 1950. She also worked as the Italian dubbing voice for actresses like Joan Crawford, Marie Dressler, and Myrna Loy. Rosina Galli died in Madrid at the age of 63.

On Broadway, Galli portrayed Theresa in Walk into My Parlor (1941).

Personal life 
She was married to Augusto Galli.

Partial filmography 

 Moonlight Murder (1936) - Louisa's Maid (uncredited)
 Conquest (1937) - Bianca - Servant (uncredited)
 International Settlement (1938) - Italian Woman (uncredited)
 Of Human Hearts (1938) - Mrs. Ardsley (uncredited)
 Yellow Jack (1938) - Spanish Woman (uncredited)
 Blockade (1938) - Waitress
 I'll Give a Million (1938) - Citizen (uncredited)
 Fisherman's Wharf (1939) - Angelina
 The Oklahoma Kid (1939) - Manuelita (uncredited)
 Missing Daughters (1939) - Italian (uncredited)
 The Rains Came (1939) - Nurse (uncredited)
 The Housekeeper's Daughter (1939) - Mrs. Veroni
 Escape to Paradise (1939) - Brigida - the Dueña
 I Take This Woman (1940) - Clinic Woman Who Lost Her baby (uncredited)
 You Can't Fool Your Wife (1940) - Mama Brentoni
 The Man Who Talked Too Much (1940) - Mrs. Spirella (uncredited)
 You're Not So Tough (1940) - Mama Posita
 Girl from God's Country (1940) - Minor Role (uncredited)
 This Thing Called Love (1940) - Mrs. Diestro
 Respect the Law (1941, Short) - Mrs. Arturi, Bereaved Italian Mother (uncredited)
 They Met in Bombay (1941) - Carmencita
 Rags to Riches (1941) - Maria
 Mob Town (1941) - Woman (uncredited)
 Gauchos of El Dorado (1941) - Isabel Ojara
 The Mad Doctor of Market Street (1942) - Tanao- Chief's Wife
 Butch Minds the Baby (1942) - Mrs. Talucci
 My Gal Sal (1942) - Countess Rossini's Maid (uncredited)
 The Pride of the Yankees (1942) - Mrs. Fabrini (uncredited)
 Underground Agent (1942) - Maria Gonzales
 Good Luck, Mr. Yates (1943) - Katy Zaloris
 Phantom of the Opera (1943) - Christine's Maid
 The Fallen Sparrow (1943) - Mama Lepetino (uncredited)
 Princess O'Rourke (1943) - Greek's Wife (uncredited)
 The Navy Way (1944) - Mrs. Zumano - Johnny's Mother (uncredited)
 The Adventures of Mark Twain (1944) - Italian Nurse (uncredited)
 Man from Frisco (1944) - Mrs. Polaski (uncredited)
 Where Do We Go from Here? (1945) - Old Lady with Lamp (uncredited)
 Star in the Night (1945, Short) - Rosa Catapoli
 Yolanda and the Thief (1945) - Housekeeper (uncredited)
 Graf Cagliostro (1949) - (uncredited)
 Volcano (1950) - A Worker
 Fugitive Lady (1950) Based on the novel Dark Road by Doris Miles Disney. - Teresa (final film role)

References

External links
 

1906 births
1969 deaths
American film actresses
Italian film actresses
Actors from Venice
20th-century Italian actresses
Italian emigrants to the United States
20th-century American actresses